Vangelis Tsiamis (born 14 July 1991) is a Greek professional footballer who plays as a centre-back for Cypriot club Omonia Aradippou.

Career
Vangelis started his football career in Veria playing for Makrochori. In 2012, he signed his first professional contract with Anagennisi Giannitsa where he stayed for two seasons. In July 15th, 2014 Vaggelis signed a three years length contract with the Superleague side Veria.

Tsiamis made his debut for Veria in Greek Football Cup, in a 0–2 away win against Ergotelis.

References

External links

1991 births
Living people
Greek footballers
Greek expatriate footballers
Veria F.C. players
Acharnaikos F.C. players
PAEEK players
Omonia Aradippou players
Super League Greece players
Cypriot Second Division players
Expatriate footballers in Cyprus
Greek expatriates in Cyprus
Association football defenders
Footballers from Veria